Tadeusz Józef Świcarz (5 June 1920 — 6 June 2002) was a Polish ice hockey and football player. In ice hockey he played for Polonia Warsaw, Legia Warsaw, Gwardia Bydgoszcz, and Znicz Pruszków. He played for the Polish national team at the 1952 Winter Olympics. Świcarz took part in the Warsaw Uprising in 1944, and was captured and held prisoner.

References

External links
 

1920 births
2002 deaths
Association football forwards
Ice hockey players at the 1952 Winter Olympics
Legia Warsaw (ice hockey) players
Olympic ice hockey players of Poland
Polish footballers
Polish ice hockey forwards
Polonia Warsaw players
Footballers from Warsaw
Warsaw Uprising insurgents
Poland international footballers
Legia Warsaw players
Śląsk Wrocław players